The Claudia Quintet are an American jazz ensemble formed in 1997 by drummer and composer John Hollenbeck. The ensemble was formed as successor to an ensemble called "the Refuseniks" with Hollenbeck and Quintet member Ted Reichman, and the quintet gets its name from a woman named Claudia who interacted with the Refuseniks. Claudia became an inside joke with the Refuseniks after she praised the performance and promised to return, but disappeared thereafter.

Personnel
As of 2010, the lineup is:
Drew Gress – double bass
John Hollenbeck – drums, percussion, composition
Matt Moran – vibraphone
Ted Reichman – accordion
Chris Speed – clarinet, tenor saxophone
The Claudia Quintet have not featured anyone named "Claudia" in the ensemble, nor any women at all.

History

Formation and naming 
In the mid 1990s, John Hollenbeck, Ted Reichman, and bassist Reuben Redding had a weekly gig at an internet café known as "alt.coffee" in East Village of New York City, playing as the "Refuseniks". One night, a woman named Claudia approached the three, expressing significant enthusiasm for the band's work and promising to tell her friends about the Refuseniks and return for future performances. After she left, Redding whispered to Hollenbeck, "She's never coming back". 

Redding was proven correct
— the three never saw Claudia again. The incident, and Claudia herself, became a running joke between the bandmates; the three quipped continually about how they "saw Claudia on the street" or received a message that she was definitely coming to see the band that week. Reuben Redding later left the trio to go to college.

Hollenbeck soon enlisted three new people in 1997 to form a quintet to play at alt.coffee, inviting saxophonist and clarinetist Chris Speed, bassist Drew Gress, and then-unknown vibraphonist Matt Moran. The group was named the "Claudia Quintet", after the woman who approached them. Hollenbeck explained that the decision served as a tribute to Reuben, a "feminine quality" to define the group, and a decentralization of himself as the quintet's leader.

Early work 
The Claudia Quintet continued playing at alt.coffee after formation, where they were reviewed by Ben Ratliff of The New York Times. Ratliff complimented Hollenbeck's ability to write for a quintet, and noted how Moran and Speed's parts as vibraphonist and clarinetist, which he says are related instruments, sometimes diverged from their unison. Ratliff noted how Gress, a bassist, sometimes keeps time instead of Hollenbeck, the quintet's drummer. However, he also refers to the performance as a "drummer's project", pointing out the constant and strong rhythm.

Ratliff again critiqued the Claudia Quintet in a 2003 performance at the Jazz Standard. He theorized that the high-brow style of the music, complete with clashing tones and Hollenbeck's "heap of little percussion toys", gave the group a charm that simultaneously prevented it from reaching more people. Ratliff also quipped that "if the music were a little bit dumber, it would resemble the music of the rock band Tortoise. No disrespect to Tortoise".

Discography
 John Hollenbeck/The Claudia Quintet (CRI, 2001)
 I, Claudia (Cuneiform, 2004)
 Semi-Formal (Cuneiform, 2005)
 For (Cuneiform, 2007)
 Royal Toast (Cuneiform, 2010)
 What Is the Beautiful? (Cuneiform, 2011)
 September (Cuneiform, 2013)
 Super Petite (Cuneiform, 2016)

References

External links
johnhollenbeck.com
The Claudia Quintet on Myspace
drewgress.com
mattmoran.com
tedreichman.com
chrisspeed.com

American jazz ensembles
Cuneiform Records artists
1997 establishments in New York City